Putzar is a village and a former municipality in the Vorpommern-Greifswald district, in Mecklenburg-Vorpommern, Germany. On 1 January 2012, it became part of the municipality Boldekow.

References

Former municipalities in Mecklenburg-Western Pomerania
States and territories disestablished in 2012